Robert A. Bickers (born 1964) is a British historian of modern China and colonialism. He is currently a professor of history at the University of Bristol. Bickers is the author of six books and editor or co-editor of three more.

Biography
Born in a Royal Air Force hospital in Wiltshire, UK, Bickers grew up living on Royal Air Force bases across England, in Germany, and in Hong Kong. He studied Chinese language at SOAS University of London during the mid-1980s, including a year studying at the Beijing Language Institute in China. After holding fellowships in Oxford University and Cambridge University, Bickers joined the department of history at the University of Bristol in 1997, where he is currently a professor of history and associate pro vice-chancellor.

Scholarship
Bickers' book Out of China was shortlisted for the 2018 Wolfson History Prize. Rana Mitter in the New York Review of Books described it as "a panoramic examination of the increasingly powerful articulation of China's national identity in the twentieth century and the country's painful encounter with Western imperialism." Empire Made Me: An Englishman Adrift in Shanghai (Allen Lane/Penguin and Columbia Univ. Press, 2003) was awarded the Morris D. Forkosch Prize of the American Historical Association.

Bickers directs the Hong Kong Kong History Project and the Historical Photographs of China digitization initiative. He is the former co-director of the British Inter-university China Centre and the REACT Knowledge Exchange Hub and is currently associate pro vice-chancellor (PGR) at the University of Bristol.

Published works
 China Bound: John Swire & Sons and Its World (Bloomsbury, 2020)
Out of China: How the Chinese Ended the Era of Western Domination (Allen Lane, 2017)  
Getting Stuck In for Shanghai: Putting the Kibosh on the Kaiser from the Bund (Penguin, 2014)  
The Scramble for China: Foreign Devils in the Qing Empire, 1832-1914 (Allen Lane/Penguin, 2011)  
Empire Made Me: An Englishman Adrift in Shanghai (Allen Lane/Penguin, 2003)  
Britain in China (Allen Lane/Penguin, 1999) 

Edited works:
Settlers and Expatriates: Britons Over the Seas (Oxford History of the British Empire, 2014) 
Britain and China, 1840-1970: Empire, Finance, and War co-edited with Jonathan J. Howlett 
Treaty Ports in Modern China: Law, Land & Power (Routledge Studies in the Modern History of Asia, 2018) co-edited with Isabella Jackson

References

External links

 Robert Bickers at the University of Bristol
 

1964 births
Living people
Academics of the University of Bristol
Alumni of SOAS University of London
Beijing Language and Culture University alumni
Historians of China
Historians of colonialism
Historians of the British Empire